The Irish Exiles is a rugby union representative team featuring players selected from the Irish diaspora, many based in Great Britain. The team was established in 1989 by Tom Kiernan. It was officially recognised by the Irish Rugby Football Union and during the 1990s was effectively a fifth provincial team along with Leinster, Ulster, Munster and Connacht. Between 1992 and 1993 and 1995–96 the Irish Exiles entered the IRFU Interprovincial Championship. The Irish Exiles also acts as an academy system for players from the Irish diaspora who wish to play for the men's national team and other IRFU national teams including the women's national team, the men's sevens team and the women's sevens team.

History

Early years
The Irish Exiles organisation was originally established by Tom Kiernan in 1989 following a meeting in London. The aim of the Irish Exiles was to give Irish diaspora players wishing to represent the Ireland national rugby union team the opportunity to play for a representative team. The Irish Exiles subsequently became a formal sub-committee of the Irish Rugby Football Union. Kiernan became the first chairman of the Exiles organisation. His successors included Barry O'Driscoll. The Exiles would eventually become a full branch of the IRFU.

In addition to establishing a senior representative team, the Exiles also established under 21 and student teams. During their first two seasons the Exiles played friendlies against Ulster at Ravenhill and a Welsh Exiles XV. The first senior XV coach was Ken Kennedy. An under 21/student team also played the Ireland U21s at the London Irish ground in Sunbury-on-Thames. 
During the 1992–93 season an Irish Exiles XV also played an away friendly against the Basque Country national rugby union team.

IRFU Interprovincial Championship
Between 1992 and 1993 and 1995–96 the Irish Exiles entered the IRFU Interprovincial Championship. Before this Irish diaspora players, including Jim Staples, Simon Geoghegan and John O'Driscoll were usually invited to represent Connacht in the championship.
Staples and Geoghegan subsequently represented the Exiles and O'Driscoll coached the team. Other Ireland internationals to represent the Exiles in the championship included David Curtis, Gary Halpin and Rob Saunders. Mat Keenan, a Western Samoa international also played for the Exiles in the competition.

Interprovincial Championship Record (1992–1996)

†Matches were played as part of the Irish Interprovincial Rugby Championship.   
Correct as of 9 February 2021.

Academy
The Irish Exiles operates as a scouting and recruitment programme for Irish diaspora players interested in playing for the Ireland national rugby union team, the Ireland women's national rugby union team, the Ireland national rugby sevens team and the Ireland women's national rugby sevens team. In addition to producing nearly thirty Ireland men's internationals, the Exiles programme has also produced three British and Irish Lions – Simon Easterby, Rob Henderson and Nick Popplewell. A number of Irish Exiles players have "slipped through the net" and have subsequently gone on to play for the England national rugby union team. These include Kieran Brookes, Paul Doran-Jones and Shane Geraghty. Recent graduates of the programme include Rhys Ruddock and Kieran Marmion.

In 2017 the IRFU attempted to "professionalise" the Exiles and introduced "IQ rugby" to the UK, managed by the High performance unit in Dublin. This was initially sold to supplement the Exiles operation, but soon disposed of the large volunteer base and caused a breakdown in long term relationships with areas previously deemed hotbeds of Irish rugby talent. This experiment has been viewed by many, both at home and in the UK, as a failure given the lack of players it has produced for age grade, provincial or senior international sides and is currently under review. There has been some vexation within the Irish rugby community at the continued funding of IQ rugby, who are deemed to have an excessive operating budget through the 20/21 pandemic, while failing to meet their sole objective. At a time when the union and provinces have seen multiple voluntary and compulsory redundancies, there has been an outcry to suspend their operations and use the money help fund the faltering grassroots game in Ireland, who have been hit hard by losses during the pandemic, and fully reinstate the Exiles control of talent identification in the UK which for many years was the envy of both the Scottish and Welsh unions.

Women's team
The Irish Exiles also field a women's rugby union team. A number of prominent members of the Ireland women's national rugby union team have progressed through the Exiles programme. These include Sophie Spence and Claire Molloy.

Notable former players
 British and Irish Lions
 
 internationals

  Ireland A internationals
 Adrian Flavin 
 Liam Mooney  
 Andi Kyriacou 
 Ed O'Donoghue 
 sevens internationals 
 Richard Briggs 
 Mark Bruce 
 Kieran Campbell
 Jon Skurr 
 women internationals

 women sevens internationals
 Sophie Spence
 internationals

 international

Notable former coaches
 Ken Kennedy
 John O'Driscoll

Similar teams
 London Irish: rugby union club founded by members of the Irish diaspora. This club is sometimes referred to as The Exiles or The Irish Exiles.
 Scottish Exiles (rugby union): a rugby union representative team featuring Scottish diaspora players.

External links
 Irish Exiles on Facebook
 Irish Exiles on Twitter

Notes

References

 
Irish rugby union teams
English rugby union teams
1989 establishments in England
Irish diaspora sports clubs in the United Kingdom
Rugby clubs established in 1989